Shashi Ruia and Ravi Ruia, commonly referred to as the Ruia Brothers, are Indian billionaires, and the owners of Essar Group, founded in 1969.

In 2012, Forbes named the Ruia brothers as the world's richest Indians with a net worth of US$7 billion.

Ravi Ruia
Ravi Ruia was born in April 1949. He is a mechanical engineer by profession, with a degree from College of Engineering, Guindy in Chennai.

He is married to Madhu, they have two children, and live in Mumbai, India.

Career
Ruia has played a critical role in steering the Essar Group to its pre-eminent position. Among the industrialists who have bought India's renaissance Ravi Ruia is said to be one of them. He started his career with his family business and worked with Shashi Ruia, his elder brother. Essar Group is a multinational conglomerate and a leading player in the sectors of steel, oil and gas, power, communications, shipping, ports and logistics, projects and minerals. With operations in more than 20 countries across five continents, the group employs 75,000 people, with revenues of US$17 billion.

Having acquired the Stanlow refinery from Shell in 2011, the Essar Group continued a strategy of international diversification. In April 2013 Ravi Ruia was awarded the Outstanding Contribution to Sustainability award at The Asian Awards in London.

It is projected that in FY 2017–18, the aggregated revenues of the portfolio companies is US$15 billion. The international standards of safety, health, environmental protection and corporate governance are maintained by the companies which operate with more than 50 assets across the globe. Essar businesses in the telecom, BPO and oil & gas sectors have involved more than $30 billion in Foreign Direct Investment by monetizing its portfolio to global majors, like Vodafone, Rosneft and Trafigura. Essar Energy completed the transaction for the sale of Essar Oil to Rosneft and a consortium led by Trafigura & UCP at an enterprise valuation of US$12.9 billion. This transaction represents Russia's largest ever foreign investment, as well as India's largest Foreign Direct Investment. He was the 12th richest person living in the UK, as in the Sunday Times Rich List 2011. Ruia managed Essar's globalization plans, including new ventures in South East Asia, Africa, and the Middle East.  He has received Business India Businessman of the Year Award 2010.

In December 2011, India's Central Bureau of Investigation commenced an investigation concerning Ruia for the sale of India's 2G spectrum, which was denied by the Essar Group.

After a lengthy legal process, in December 2017, the Indian Courts acquitted Ruia of any impropriety in the case, holding that the prosecution had "miserably failed to prove any charge against any of the accused".

See also
 David and Frederick Barclay

References

Living people
Rajasthani people
Businesspeople from Mumbai
2G spectrum case
Indian businesspeople in the oil industry
Business duos
Indian billionaires
Year of birth missing (living people)
People charged with corruption